Ike Landvoigt (born 19 September 1973) is a retired German rower who won a gold and a silver medal in the eights at the world championships of 1995 and 1998, respectively. He finished in 9th and 11th place in the coxless fours at the 1996 and 2000 Olympics, respectively. His father Jörg is also a retired Olympic rower.

References 

1973 births
Living people
Sportspeople from Potsdam
People from Bezirk Potsdam
German male rowers
Sportspeople from Brandenburg
Olympic rowers of Germany
Rowers at the 1996 Summer Olympics
Rowers at the 2000 Summer Olympics
World Rowing Championships medalists for Germany
20th-century German people
21st-century German people